Marvel Preview is a black-and-white comics magazine published by Magazine Management for fourteen issues and the affiliated Marvel Comics Group for ten issues. The final issue additionally carried the imprint Marvel Magazines Group.

Publication history 
An umbrella title that showcased a different heroic-adventure, science-fiction, or sword-and-sorcery character in virtually every issue. The title introduced the Marvel Comics characters Dominic Fortune in issue #2, Star-Lord in #4, and Rocket Raccoon in #7. The vigilante character the Punisher, introduced as an antagonist in the comic book The Amazing Spider-Man, had his first solo story in issue #2.

The magazine experienced scheduling difficulties, with various "Next Issue" announcements proving unreliable. Issue #2 promised an adventure of the Marvel superhero Thor in #3, but a Blade story appeared, with the Thor story remaining unseen until #10. As well, two different issues, #20 and 24, are dated "Winter 1980, at the start and end of the year." Issue #20 was to have included photographs from the Japanese Spider-Man television program, but instead featured Howard Chaykin's Dominic Fortune. In addition, Robert A. Heinlein's lawyers threatened legal action over the cover of Marvel Preview #11, which featured a blurb that described the Star-Lord content as "a novel-length science fiction spectacular in the tradition of Robert A. Heinlein," leading to the issue being pulled and reprinted.

With #25 (March 1981), the title was changed to Bizarre Adventures, which ran for an additional ten issues before ceasing publication. To offset the dark tone of most of the stories, editor Denny O'Neil had writer Steve Skeates produce a humor feature called Bucky Bizarre to close out each issue. A story originally prepared for Marvel's Logan's Run comic book series was published in Bizarre Adventures #28 (Oct. 1981). The final issue, #34, was a standard-sized color comic book, featuring the cover-blurb, "Special Hate the Holidays Issue", with anthological Christmas-related stories, including one starring Howard the Duck.

Issues

Bizarre Adventures

Collected editions
 Essential Punisher Vol. 1 includes the Punisher story from Marvel Preview #2, 568 pages, March 2004,  
 Dominic Fortune: It Can Happen Here and Now includes Dominic Fortune story from Marvel Preview #2, 184 pages, February 2010, 
 Blade: Black & White includes Blade the Vampire Slayer stories from Marvel Preview #3 and 6, 144 pages, December 2004, 
 Star-Lord: Guardian of the Galaxy includes Star-Lord stories from Marvel Preview #4, 11, 14-15, and 18, 424 pages, July 2014,  
 Essential Marvel Horror Vol. 1 includes Satana story from Marvel Preview #7, 648 pages, October 2006,  
 Rocket Raccoon: Guardian of the Keystone Quadrant includes Rocket Raccoon story from Marvel Preview #7, 120 pages, August 2011,  
 Essential Moon Knight Vol. 1 includes the Moon Knight story from Marvel Preview #21, 560 pages, February 2006,  
 Black Widow: Web of Intrigue includes the Black Widow story from Bizarre Adventures #25, 176 pages, April 2010, 
 Deadly Hands of Kung Fu Omnibus Vol. 2 includes the Daughters of the Dragon story from Bizarre Adventures #25, 1,000 pages, June 2017, 
 The Savage Sword of Kull Vol. 1 includes King Kull story from Bizarre Adventures #26, 448 pages, November 2010,   
 X-Men: Iceman includes the Iceman story from Bizarre Adventures #27, 120 pages, August 2012,  
 X-Men: The Dark Phoenix Saga includes Phoenix story from Bizarre Adventures #27, 200 pages, April 2012, 
 Elektra by Frank Miller Omnibus includes Elektra story from Bizarre Adventures #28, 384 pages, November 2008, 
 The Uncanny X-Men Omnibus Vol. 2 includes the Jean Grey, Iceman, and Nightcrawler stories from Bizarre Adventures #27, 912 pages, April 2014,

References

External links
 
 
 Marvel Preview at the Unofficial Handbook of Marvel Comics Creators

Marvel Comics titles
1975 comics debuts
1983 comics endings
Comics by Chris Claremont
Comics by Doug Moench
Comics by Roy Thomas
Comics by Steve Englehart
Comics by Steve Gerber
Defunct American comics